Sence v očesu is a novel by Slovenian author . It was first published in 2000.

See also
List of Slovenian novels

References

Slovenian novels
2000 novels